Mark J. Coogan (born May 1, 1966, Manhasset, New York, United States) is an American coach and retired American track athlete.

Running career
He attended Bishop Feehan High School in Attleboro, Massachusetts, and the University of Maryland, College Park.

Coogan was coached at the University of Maryland by Charles Florence Torpey, who headed the Men's and Women's running teams at La Salle University until his untimely death. While in college, Coogan specialized in the steeplechase.  Coogan was the first Massachusetts native to run the mile in under four minutes. In March 1995, at the Pan-American Games (Mar del Plata, Argentina), Coogan earned the silver medal in the Marathon, in a time of 2:15:21. He ran the marathon at the 1996 Summer Olympics in Atlanta, placing 41st with a time of 2:20:27, after placing second in the U.S. Olympic Trials Marathon with at time of 2:13:05 (his lifetime best). He also placed third in the U.S. 2000 Olympic Trials Marathon with a time of 2:17:04, but did not compete in the 2000 Sydney Olympics because he did not achieve the Olympic "A" standard qualifying time. He retired from competitive running in 2004.

Coaching career
He has served as head coach of several cross country teams, including at Phillips Exeter Academy and Tufts University, and coached the distance runners at MIT for three years. Coogan served as the Dartmouth College women's cross country head coach after serving as an assistant for one season, and the assistant coach for the track programs as the primary coach of the distance runners.

In 2014, he began working for New Balance in Boston, Massachusetts in sports marketing as well becoming the coach of Team New Balance Boston with athletes such as Abbey D'Agostino whom he coached to 7 NCAA Championships at Dartmouth College.

In June 2021, Mark successfully coached American New Balance sponsored distance runners Elle Purrier St. Pierre of Vermont and Heather MacLean of Massachusetts in the 1,500 meters at the Olympic Trials at Haywood Field in Eugene, Oregon. Both women will represent the USA at the Tokyo Olympics.

Personal life
Coogan has three children, two daughters, Katrina Coogan, a professional runner for New Balance Boston, and Margaret Coogan, who runs at George Washington University, and a son, William Coogan, who runs at UNC-Chapel Hill.

Achievements

References

External links
 
 

1966 births
Living people
American male long-distance runners
American male steeplechase runners
Athletes (track and field) at the 1995 Pan American Games
Athletes (track and field) at the 1996 Summer Olympics
Olympic track and field athletes of the United States
People from Manhasset, New York
University of Maryland, College Park alumni
Pan American Games medalists in athletics (track and field)
Pan American Games silver medalists for the United States
Medalists at the 1995 Pan American Games